The United States Senate curator is an employee of the United States Senate who is responsible for developing and implementing the museum and preservation programs for the Senate Commission on Art.  The Curator Office collects, preserves, and interprets the Senate's fine and decorative arts, historic objects, and architectural features. Through exhibits, publications, and other programs, the Office educates the public about the Senate and its collections.

The current curatrix is Melinda Smith.

List of Senate curators
 Joseph Dougherty 1968–1969
 Richard A. Baker (acting) 1969–1970
 James R. Ketchum 1970–1995
 Diane K. Skvarla 1995–2014
 Melinda Smith 2014–present

External links
 Office of Senate Curator Website
C-SPAN Q&A interview with Diane Skvarla, July 2, 2006

Employees of the United States Senate